Littorina obtusata, common name the flat periwinkle, is a species of sea snail, a marine gastropod mollusk in the family Littorinidae, the winkles or periwinkles.

Distribution
This marine species occurs wherever brown seaweeds grow. It is widely distributed : the Baltic Sea, in European waters from Norway down to Southern Spain, in the Mediterranean Sea, in the Northeast Atlantic Ocean along the Gulf of Maine.

Description 
The maximum recorded shell length is 13.5 mm.

Habitat 
This species can be found in the littoral and sublittoral zone on rocky shores and piers, usually on brown algae of the genus Fucus. Minimum recorded depth is 0 m. Maximum recorded depth is 110 m. The habitat may define its color. On sheltered shores it has a lighter and uniform color (yellow, brown, orange or olive green). On exposed shores its color is darker and chequered.

References
Notes

Bibliography
 Backeljau, T. (1986). Lijst van de recente mariene mollusken van België [List of the recent marine molluscs of Belgium]. Koninklijk Belgisch Instituut voor Natuurwetenschappen: Brussels, Belgium. 106 pp
 Reid, D.G. (1989a) The comparative morphology, phylogeny and evolution of the gastropod family Littorinidae. Philosophical Transactions of the Royal Society of London, Series B 324: 1–110
 Reid D.G. (1996). Systematics and evolution of Littorina. The Ray Society 463p
 BODC (2009). Species list from the British Oceanographic Data Centre

External links
 
 

Littorinidae
Gastropods described in 1758
Taxa named by Carl Linnaeus